Markus Messenzehl (born 20 June 1972 in Oberstdorf) is a German curler. He is World men's silver medallist and two time European men's champion. He competed at the 2002 Salt Lake City Olympics on the German team that placed sixth with a 4-5 record.

Teams

References

External links
 
 Curling: Schach auf dem Eis - Olympische Winterspiele - Olympia - Mittelbayerische 

1972 births
Living people
People from Oberstdorf
Sportspeople from Swabia (Bavaria)
German male curlers
Olympic curlers of Germany
Curlers at the 2002 Winter Olympics
European curling champions